The Hercules Graphics Card (HGC) is a computer graphics controller formerly made by Hercules Computer Technology, Inc. that combines IBM's text-only MDA display standard with a bitmapped graphics mode. This allows the HGC to offer both high-quality text and graphics from a single card.

The HGC was very popular, and became a widely supported de facto display standard on IBM PC compatibles. The HGC standard was used long after more technically capable systems had entered the market, especially on dual-monitor setups.

History
The Hercules Graphics Card was released to fill a gap in the IBM video product lineup. When the IBM Personal Computer was launched in 1981, it had two graphics cards available, the Color Graphics Adapter (CGA) and the Monochrome Display And Printer Adapter (MDA). CGA offers low-resolution (320x200) color graphics and medium-resolution (640x200) monochrome graphics, while MDA offers a sharper text mode (equivalent of 720×350) but has no per-pixel addressing modes and is limited to a fixed character set.

These adapters were quickly found to be inadequate by the market, creating a demand for a card that offers high-resolution graphics and text. The founder of Hercules Computer Technology, Van Suwannukul, created the Hercules Graphics Card so that he could work on his doctoral thesis on an IBM PC using the Thai alphabet, impossible with the low resolution of CGA or the fixed character set of MDA. It initially retailed in 1982 for $499.

Hardware design 
The original HGC is an 8-bit ISA card with 64KB of RAM, visible on the board as eight 4164 RAM chips, and a DE-9 output compatible with the IBM monochrome monitor used with the MDA. Like the MDA, it includes a parallel interface for attaching a printer.

The video output is 5V TTL, as with the MDA card. Nominally, the Hercules card provides a horizontal scanning frequency of 18.425 ±0.500 kHz, and 50 Hz vertical. It runs at two slightly different frequencies depending on whether in text or graphics mode, due to the slight difference in horizontal resolution.

Capabilities 

The Hercules card provides two modes: an MDA-compatible monochrome text mode, and a pixel-addressable graphics mode at 720x348. 

Modes:

 80×25 text mode with 9×14 pixel font (effective resolution of 720×350)
 720×348 graphics mode

The text mode of the Hercules card uses the same signal timing as the MDA text mode.

The Hercules graphics mode is similar to the CGA high-resolution (640×200) two-color mode; the video buffer contains a packed-pixel bitmap (eight pixels per byte, one bit per pixel) with the same byte format—including the pixel-to-bit mapping and byte order—as the CGA two-color graphics mode, and the video buffer is also split into interleaved banks, each 8 KB in size.

However, because in the Hercules graphics mode there are more than 256 scanlines and the display buffer size is nearly 32 KB (instead of 16 KB as in all CGA graphics modes), four interleaved banks are used in the Hercules mode instead of two as in the CGA modes. Also, to represent 720 pixels per line instead of 640 as on the CGA, each scanline has 90 bytes of pixel data instead of 80. 

The 64 KB RAM of the HGC can hold two graphics display pages.  Either page can be selected for display by setting a single bit in the Mode Control Register.  Another bit, in a configuration register exclusive to the HGC, determines whether the second 32 KB of RAM on the HGC is accessible to the CPU at the base address B8000h.  This bit is reset at system reset (e.g. power-on) so that the card does not conflict with a CGA or other color card at address B8000h.

Use 
In text mode, the HGC appears exactly like an MDA card. Graphics mode requires new techniques to use. Unlike the MDA and CGA, the PC BIOS provides no intrinsic support for the HGC. Hercules developed extensions, called HBASIC, for IBM Advanced BASIC to add HGC support and Hercules cards came with Graph X, a software library for Hercules graphical-mode support and geometric primitives.

Popular IBM PC programs such as Lotus 1-2-3 spreadsheet, AutoCAD computer-aided drafting, Pagemaker and Xerox Ventura desktop publishing, and Microsoft Flight Simulator 2.0 came with their own drivers to use the Hercules graphics mode.

Though the graphics mode of the Hercules card is not CGA-compatible, it is similar enough to the two CGA graphics modes that with the use of third-party terminate-and-stay-resident programs it can also work with programs written for the CGA card's standard graphics modes. As the Hercules card does not actually have color-generating circuitry, nor can it connect to a color monitor, color appears as simulated greyscale in varying dithering patterns.

Clones of the Hercules appeared, including generic models at very low prices, usually without the printer port. Hercules advertisements implied that use of generic Hercules clones can damage the monitor.

Reception 
The Hercules Graphics Card was very successful, especially after Lotus 1-2-3 supported it, with one half million units sold by 1985.  Hercules Computer Technology had 18% of the graphics card market, second to IBM. Hercules-compatible graphics cards shipped as standard hardware with most PC clones. As a de facto standard, support in software was widespread.

Later cards 

The Hercules Graphics Card was followed by several other Hercules cards.

 Hercules Graphics Card Plus (HGC+) This card was released in June 1986 by Hercules Computer Technology, Inc. at an original retail price of $299. It was an enhancement of the HGC, adding support for redefinable fonts called RAMFONT in MDA compatible text mode. It was based around a specialty chip designed by Hercules Computer Technology, unlike the original Hercules Graphics Card which used standard components. Software support included Lotus 1-2-3 v2, Symphony 1.1, Framework II and Microsoft Word 3.
 Hercules Network Card Plus In 1988 Hercules released the Network Card Plus, a variant of the Graphics Card Plus with an integrated TOPS/FlashTalk-compatible network adapter. Like the HGC+ it supported RAMFONT, but lacked a printer port.
 Hercules InColor Card April 1987. Included color capabilities similar to the EGA, with 16 colors from a palette of 64. It retained the same two modes (80×25 text with redefinable fonts and 720×348 graphics), and was backward compatible with software written for the earlier monochrome Hercules cards.
 Hercules Color Card Not to be confused with the InColor Card. A CGA-compatible video board. This board could coexist with the HGC and still allow both graphics pages to be used. It would detect when the second graphics page was selected and disable access to its own memory, which would otherwise have been at the same addresses.

Clone boards 
Other boards offered Hercules compatibility.

 SiS 86C12, 86C22
 ATI Small Wonder Graphics Solution, 18700, Graphics Solution Plus
 Tamarack Microelectronics TD3088A, TD3088A2, TD3088A3, TD3010, RY-3301, TD3010
 Yamaha V6366C-F, V6363-F, V6363
 Winbond W86855AF, W86855AF
 NEC μPD65042GD
 Tseng Labs ET1000-A
 DFI MG-150
 Hitachi HD6445P4, HD6845SP
 RAM MCG2502, MCG2502
 Proton PT6121T
 Acer M3127
 Sigma Designs 53C101+53C280A
 CM607P

Certain later models of the Tandy 1000 (such as the 1000 TL and SL) and the Epson Equity contained circuitry built into their CPU boards that supported Hercules display modes in addition to their standard CGA modes.

See also

Orchid Graphics Adapter
Plantronics Colorplus
IBM Monochrome Display Adapter
Color Graphics Adapter
List of display interfaces
List of defunct graphics chips and card companies

References

Further reading 

 Wilton, Richard (1987) Programmer's Guide To PC and PS/2 Video Systems, Microsoft Press, 
 Hercules Computer Technology (1987) Hercules Compatibility Guide (a leaflet)
 "Hercules graphics" definition , Wi-FiPlanet.com
 How to Print Hercules Graphics SCREEN 3 to an Epson Printer, Microsoft.com
 Hercules Monochrome Graphics Adapter, Everything2.com

Graphics cards
Computer display standards
Monochrome Display Adapter
Computer-related introductions in 1982